Triethyl orthoformate is an organic compound with the formula HC(OC2H5)3.  This colorless volatile liquid, the orthoester of formic acid, is commercially available.  The industrial synthesis is from hydrogen cyanide and ethanol.

It may also be prepared from the reaction of sodium ethoxide, formed in-situ from sodium and absolute ethanol, and chloroform:

 CHCl3 + 3 Na + 3 EtOH → HC(OEt)3 +  H2 + 3 NaCl

Triethyl orthoformate is used in the Bodroux-Chichibabin aldehyde synthesis, for example:
 RMgBr  +  HC(OC2H5)3   →   RC(H)(OC2H5)2  +  MgBr(OC2H5)
 RC(H)(OC2H5)2  +  H2O   →    RCHO  +  2 C2H5OH

In coordination chemistry, it is used to convert metal aquo complexes to the corresponding ethanol complexes:
[Ni(H2O)6](BF4)2  +  6  HC(OC2H5)3   →  [Ni(C2H5OH)6](BF4)2  +  6 HC(O)(OC2H5)  +  6  HOC2H5

Triethyl orthoformate (TEOF) is an excellent reagent for converting compatible carboxylic acids to ethyl esters. Such carboxylic acids, refluxed neat in excess TEOF until low-boilers cease evolution, are quantitatively converted to the ethyl esters, without need for extraneous catalysis.  Alternatively, added to ordinary esterifications using catalytic acid and ethanol, TEOF helps drive esterification to completion by converting the byproduct water formed to ethanol and ethyl formate.

See also
Trimethyl orthoformate

References

Orthoesters
Ethyl esters